The 2004 Scottish Claymores season was the tenth and final season for the franchise in the NFL Europe League (NFLEL). The team was led by head coach Jack Bicknell in his first year, and played its home games at Hampden Park in Glasgow, Scotland. They finished the regular season in sixth place with a record of two wins and eight losses.

Offseason

Free agent draft

Personnel

Staff

Roster

Schedule

Standings

Game summaries

Week 1: at Berlin Thunder

Week 2: at Rhein Fire

Week 3: vs Amsterdam Admirals

Week 4: at Cologne Centurions

Week 5: vs Rhein Fire

Week 6: vs Frankfurt Galaxy

Week 7: at Frankfurt Galaxy

Week 8: at Amsterdam Admirals

Week 9: vs Berlin Thunder

Week 10: vs Cologne Centurions

Notes

References

Scottish
Scottish Claymores seasons